Blood Duster is Blood Duster's fourth full-length album.

Background

Title
A competition was run on the band's messageboard to suggest album names, with some responses being Fucked Up by the Grace of God and Taming The Manaconda. Another suggestion was For Those About To Fuck, but this was used as the name for the first track instead.

Content
The album itself is labelled by the band as being "Psychodeathrockin’punkpimpin’icedealing gangstashit" and is an attempt to establish the genre of 'Anthemic Grind Rock'. With Blood Duster having secured an endorsement from the Black Flys sunglasses brand, Jason PC Fuller suggested in an interview with Andrew Tijs of Beat that the band had become "corporate rock whores" This album took longer to record than previous Blood Duster albums and features a number of guest appearances including Jay Dunne from 28 Days, original AC/DC singer Dave Evans and the complete line-up of Melbourne band The Spazzys. It also contains the singles DrinkFightFuck, SixSixSixteen and IWannaDoItWithADonna.

Censorship controversy

This album was surrounded by some controversy. There was originally supposed to be bonus CD-ROM material included with the album but, due to censorship rules in Australia and the distributor not putting ratings on it, this material was censored, along with several photos that were to appear in the CD booklet.

The CD-ROM was to include live footage of Blood Duster performing Kill Kill Kill, 66.6 on Your FM Dial and Derek, as well as a video of the band performing DrinkFightFuck at the single's launch. There was also a video entitled "D-Unit's Metal for the Brain 2005" that was censored because it showed certain band members taking drugs, namely cocaine. Some of the material that was supposed to be on the CD-ROM can be accessed at the band's website using the HippieKillTeam password hidden in the CD case.

Although some photos were censored in the compiling of the CD booklet, it still contains 125 small colour photos, including some featuring nudity and oral sex.

Track listing

 "For Those about to Fuck" (Fuller) - 1:38
 "Idi" (Fuller) - 0:54
 "Six Six Sixteen" (Fuller/Collins/Nixon) - 2:27
 "Cock Junkie" (Fuller/Collins) - 1:07
 "Sellout"  (Fuller/Collins) - 1:21
 "I Wanna Do It with a Donna"  (Fuller/Collins) - 3:01
 "Fruity Relationships"  (Fuller/Nixon) - 1:09
 "Heroin Punk"  (Fuller/Beltsy) - 1:03
 "Sk8er Grrl"  (Fuller/Collins) - 0:26
 "Bad Habits" (Fuller/Collins) - 1:19 
 "On the Stage"  (Fuller/Nixon) - 0:51
 "Vegan Feast"  (Fuller/Beltsy) - 1:28
 "Drink Fight Fuck"  (Fuller/Collins) - 2:09
 "Tony Goes to Court" - (skit)  - 0:31
 "On the Hunt"  (Fuller/Nixon) - 1:05
 "Current Trends"  (Fuller/Collins) - 0:29
 "Underground"  (Fuller/Collins) - 0:49
 "Drug Fiend"  (Fuller) - 1:29
 "Achin' for an 'A' Cup"  (Fuller/Collins) - 0:22
 "Dahmer The Embalmer"  (Fuller/Collins) - 1:13
 "She's a Junkie"  (Fuller/Collins) - 2:46
 "NuCorporate"  (Fuller/Nixon) - 2:59

Credits
Jason Fuller - bass, vocals
Matt Rizzo - drums
Josh Nixon - guitar on #22
Matt Collins - guitar, vocals
Scott Pritchard - guitar, vocals
Tony Forde - vocals

Guests:

Rob Mollica - backing vocals on #13
Mike Filth - backing vocals on #13
Rick - backing vocals on #13
Deanne - backing vocals on #13
Olivia - backing vocals on #13
Dave Evans - vocals on #5
The Spazzys - vocals on #6
Jay Dunne - vocals on #13
Craig Westwood - vocals on #22

Production:

Recorded by Adam Calaitzis at Toyland Recording Studio
Mastered by Joseph Carra at Crystal Mastering
Produced by Jason PC
Art by Craig Westwood based on a design by Jason PC 
Art layout by Matt Collins

References 

Blood Duster albums
2003 albums
Season of Mist albums